A by-election was held in the state electoral district of Manly on 15 September 1945. The by-election was triggered by the death of Alfred Reid ( turned ).

Dates

Candidates
Douglas Darby was the founder of the British Orphans' Adoption Society, a member of the United Nations Relief and Rehabilitation Association
James Dunn (Soldiers' party) was the former Labor candidate for Manly, but was defeated for pre-selection by Hanson-Norman
Aubrey Hanson-Norman was a former mayor of Manly

Result

Alfred Reid ( turned ) died.

See also
Electoral results for the district of Manly
List of New South Wales state by-elections

References

1945 elections in Australia
New South Wales state by-elections
1940s in New South Wales
September 1945 events in Australia